Dinsdale is the westernmost suburb of  Hamilton in New Zealand. Originally called Frankton West, it was renamed in July 1961 after Thomas Dinsdale. Dinsdale grew rapidly in the 1960s. It is located around a low ridge with some views westward to open farm land. It has a large sports ground and shopping complex with a supermarket, shops and Dinsdale Library, one of the branches of the Hamilton City Libraries. The community church of West Hamilton is located in the suburb.

Demographics

Dinsdale had a population of 8,349 at the 2018 New Zealand census, an increase of 585 people (7.5%) since the 2013 census, and an increase of 801 people (10.6%) since the 2006 census. There were 2,874 households, comprising 4,122 males and 4,230 females, giving a sex ratio of 0.97 males per female, with 1,824 people (21.8%) aged under 15 years, 1,863 (22.3%) aged 15 to 29, 3,606 (43.2%) aged 30 to 64, and 1,053 (12.6%) aged 65 or older.

Ethnicities were 73.0% European/Pākehā, 29.2% Māori, 5.8% Pacific peoples, 9.2% Asian, and 2.4% other ethnicities. People may identify with more than one ethnicity.

The percentage of people born overseas was 15.9, compared with 27.1% nationally.

Although some people chose not to answer the census's question about religious affiliation, 51.5% had no religion, 35.1% were Christian, 1.1% had Māori religious beliefs, 2.2% were Hindu, 0.8% were Muslim, 0.8% were Buddhist and 2.3% had other religions.

Of those at least 15 years old, 1,149 (17.6%) people had a bachelor's or higher degree, and 1,296 (19.9%) people had no formal qualifications. 894 people (13.7%) earned over $70,000 compared to 17.2% nationally. The employment status of those at least 15 was that 3,543 (54.3%) people were employed full-time, 876 (13.4%) were part-time, and 306 (4.7%) were unemployed.

Education 
Aberdeen School is acoeducational contributing primary school (years 1–6) with a roll of  students as of  Aberdeen opened in the mid-1970s.

Neighboring surroundings 
The Taitua Arboretum may be accessed via Tills Lookout. Hamilton, New Zealand

See also

 List of streets in Hamilton

Suburbs of Hamilton, New Zealand

References

1962 establishments in New Zealand
Populated places established in 1962
Suburbs of Hamilton, New Zealand